The 1932 Sewanee Tigers football team was an American football team that represented Sewanee: The University of the South as a member of the Southern Conference during the 1932 college football season. In their second season under head coach Harry E. Clark, Sewanee compiled a 2–7–1 record.

Schedule

References

Sewanee
Sewanee Tigers football seasons
Sewanee Tigers football